Mary Jane Milne (16 September 1840 – 4 April 1921) was a New Zealand milliner and businesswoman, known as a co-owner of the Milne & Choyce department store in Auckland. She was born in Coalisland, County Tyrone, Ireland, on 16 September 1840. The family left Ireland in July 1863.

In 2012, Milne was posthumously inducted into the New Zealand Business Hall of Fame.

References

1840 births
1921 deaths
New Zealand women in business
19th-century New Zealand businesspeople
19th-century New Zealand businesswomen
Irish emigrants to New Zealand (before 1923)